It Just Comes Natural is the twenty-fourth studio album by American country music singer George Strait. The album produced Strait's 41st Number One Billboard Hot Country Songs) hit in its lead-off single "Give It Away". Also released from this album were the title track (also #1 on Hot Country Songs), "Wrapped" (#2), and "How 'Bout Them Cowgirls" (#3). The album itself has been certified platinum by the RIAA. "It Just Comes Natural" was nominated for Best Country Album at the 2008 Grammy Awards.

Content
"Give It Away" is the album's first single. Released in mid-2006, this song reached Number One on the Billboard country charts, becoming Strait's 41st Number One hit on that chart, and breaking Conway Twitty's record for the most Billboard Number One hits by a country music artist. Following this song was the title track, his 42nd Number One. "Wrapped" was the third single, and finishing out the releases was "How 'Bout Them Cowgirls".

Track listing

Personnel
As listed in liner notes.
Eddie Bayers – drums
Tony Brown – background vocals on "Texas Cookin'"
Stuart Duncan – fiddle, mandolin
Paul Franklin – pedal steel guitar
Steve Gibson – acoustic guitar, electric guitar, gut string guitar
Wes Hightower – background vocals
Brent Mason – electric guitar, gut string guitar
Mac McAnally – acoustic guitar
Steve Nathan – Hammond B-3 organ, Wurlitzer, synthesizer
Matt Rollings – piano, Hammond B-3 organ, synthesizer
Marty Slayton – background vocals
George Strait – lead vocals
Jeff Taylor – accordion on "Come On Joe"
Glenn Worf – bass guitar on all tracks except "She Told Me So", upright bass on "She Told Me So"

All musicians except Jeff Taylor also perform background vocals on "Texas Cookin'."

Strings on tracks #10, #12, and #13 performed by the Nashville String Machine. Arranged and conducted by Bergen White and contracted by Carl Gorodetzky.

Charts

Weekly charts

Year-end charts

Certifications

References

2006 albums
George Strait albums
MCA Records albums
Albums produced by Tony Brown (record producer)